is a Japanese professional wrestler currently working for the Japanese promotions World Wonder Ring Stardom where she is a former one-time Future of Stardom Champion

Professional wrestling career

Independent circuit (2017-present)
She competed for one time in Sendai Girls' Pro Wrestling in a dark exhibition match which took place at a house show from April 6, 2017 where she fell short to Manami.

World Wonder Ring Stardom (2016-present)
Ruaka made her professional wrestling debut at the early age of 12, at Goddesses Of Stars, an event promoted by World Wonder Ring Stardom on November 20, 2016 where she teamed up with Arisu Nanase in a losing effort to AZM and Natsuko Tora.

She is known for competing in various of the promotion's signature events such as the Stardom All Star Dream Cinderella from March 3, 2021 where she competed in a 24-women Stardom All Star Rumble featuring superstars from the company's past such as Yuzuki Aikawa, Kyoko Inoue, Miho Wakizawa, Chigusa Nagayo, from the present Bea Priestley, Koguma and others. At Stardom Yokohama Dream Cinderella 2021 on April 4, she teamed up with fellow Oedo Tai stablemates Natsuko Tora, Konami, Saki Kashima and Rina to defeat STARS (Mayu Iwatani, Saya Iida, Starlight Kid, Hanan and Gokigen Death) in a Ten-woman elimination tag team match in which Death was eliminated the last and was forced to join Oedo Tai. Ruaka took part in all three of the Stardom Cinderella Tournament 2021 tournament's nights. In the first one from April 10 she fell short to Giulia in a first-round match, on the second one from May 14 she fell short to Mina Shirakawa in a tournament for the vacant Future of Stardom Championship and on the third one from June 12 she teamed up with her stablemates Natsuko Tora, Konami, Fukigen Death and Saki Kashima to defeat Stars (Mayu Iwatani, Starlight Kid, Hanan, Koguma and Rin Kadokura) in a Ten-woman elimination tag team match and since Kid was eliminated the last she was forced to join Oedo Tai. At Yokohama Dream Cinderella 2021 in Summer on July 4, she teamed up with Starlight Kid to unsuccessfully challenge Queen's Quest (Momo Watanabe and AZM). In the Stardom 5 Star Grand Prix 2021, Ruaka fought in the "Blue Stars" Block obtaining a total of zero points after compting against Syuri, Saya Kamitani, Takumi Iroha, Konami, Utami Hayashishita, Tam Nakano, Maika, Unagi Sayaka and AZM. At Stardom 10th Anniversary Grand Final Osaka Dream Cinderella on October 9, Ruaka defeated Unagi Sayaka to win the Future of Stardom Championship.

Championships and accomplishments
World Wonder Ring Stardom
Future of Stardom Championship (1 time)
Stardom Year-End Award (1 time)
Best Unit Award (2021) 
Top Unit Trios Tournament (2017) – with Natsuko Tora and Saki Kashima

References 

2004 births
Living people
Japanese female professional wrestlers
People from Tokyo
21st-century professional wrestlers
Future of Stardom Champions